The Edinburgh Assay Office is the last remaining Assay Office in Scotland and one of four which remain in the United Kingdom.

The history of hallmarking at the Edinburgh Assay Office can be traced back to 1457 when the first hallmarking act of Scotland was created. It is an independent privately run business, owned by the Incorporation of Goldsmiths of the City of Edinburgh. Since 1457, the deacon, or leader of the craft, assayed and marked the members' wares, but in 1681 a separate Assay Master was appointed to oversee this task.  The first Assay Master was John Borthwick. The incorporation's importance in the life of the city and country was confirmed in 1687 when King James VII granted it a royal charter.

The Edinburgh Assay Office is housed in a category B listed building, Goldsmiths Hall in Broughton Street. It is a former church, built in 1816, which was fully refurbished and opened as the assay office in 1999 by Princess Anne.

The assay office primarily tests and hallmarks precious metal. In 1973 the Hallmarking Act was passed, then in 2010 palladium became the fourth precious metal to be assayed.

References

External links 
 

Precious metals
Category B listed buildings in Edinburgh
1457 establishments in Scotland
Product-testing organizations